Stella is a 1943 Argentine romantic drama film directed by Benito Perojo and starring Zully Moreno, Florindo Ferrario and Guillermo Battaglia. At the 1944 Argentine Film Critics Association Awards, Gregorio López Naguil won the Silver Condor award for Best Production Design.

Cast
Zully Moreno
Florindo Ferrario
Stella Río
Rafael Frontaura
Guillermo Battaglia
Fernando Lamas
María Santos
Mary Parets
Chela Cordero
Carlos Lagrotta

References

External links
 

1943 films
1940s Spanish-language films
Argentine black-and-white films
Films directed by Benito Perojo
Argentine romantic drama films
1943 romantic drama films
1940s Argentine films